Notamblyscirtes is a genus of grass skippers in the butterfly family Hesperiidae. There is one described species in Notamblyscirtes, N. simius.

References

Further reading

 
 
 

Hesperiinae
Articles created by Qbugbot